is a Japanese model and actress.

Filmography

TV series
Doremisora (2002)
Kokoro (2003)
Kamen Rider 555 (2003) - Mari Sonada
Shin: Inochi no genba kara (2004)
Sh15uya (2005)
Kamen Rider Kiva (2008) - Mio Suzuki/Pearlshell Fangire
Kamen Rider Decade (2009) - Yuki (ep. 30)/Thorn Fangire (ep. 30)
Kamen Rider Dragon Knight: Maya Young/Kamen Rider Siren Japanese Dub (2009)
Oha Star
Zero: Dragon Blood (2017)

Movies
Dokomademo ikou (1999)
Gaichû (2001)
Kamen Rider 555: Paradise Lost (2003) - Mari Sonada
Koi suru nichiyobi (Love on Sunday) (2006)
Master of Thunder: Kessen!! Fûmaryûkoden (Summer 2006)End Call (2008)Girl's Blood (2014)

TheatreFruits Basket'' (2022), Kyōko Honda

References

External links
 

Yuria Haga no YUU' LIFE  - Official Blog with her photographs, since February 2007

Japanese actresses
People from Tokyo
1987 births
Living people
Japanese female models
Models from Tokyo Metropolis